The Grand Rapids Griffins are a professional ice hockey team based in Grand Rapids, Michigan. They are members of the North Division of the Western Conference in the American Hockey League (AHL). The team was founded in 1996 as an expansion franchise in the International Hockey League (IHL), and moved to the AHL following the IHL's folding in 2001.  After playing their first three seasons as an independent team, Grand Rapids entered into an affiliation agreement with the Ottawa Senators in 1999.  When that deal expired in 2002, the Griffins signed an agreement with the Detroit Red Wings.  The two teams' current agreement lasts through the 2016–17 season. The Griffins won their first Calder Cup in 2013. Through the 2013–14 season, 460 players have played at least one game for the Grand Rapids Griffins, either in the regular season or in the playoffs.

One hundred thirty Griffins players have gone on to play in the National Hockey League (NHL); seventy-one of them made their NHL debut after skating for Grand Rapids.  Nine former Griffins had their named engraved on the Stanley Cup as members of the Detroit Red Wings in 2008.  While Detroit and Ottawa have been frequent NHL destinations for former members of the Griffins, owing to their respective affiliation tenures, every current NHL club has had a Griffins alumnus on its roster at some point.  Numerous Griffins players have been recognized by the IHL or AHL for their play.  Donald MacLean won the Les Cunningham Award as the AHL's most valuable player for the 2005–06 season; Niklas Kronwall won the Eddie Shore Award the previous season as the league's top defenseman.  Derek King was a co-winner of the Leo P. Lamoureux Memorial Trophy for leading the IHL in scoring for the 2000–01 season. Eight  Griffins have been named First Team All-Stars by either the IHL or the AHL.

Travis Richards, a member of the Griffins from their inception in 1996 until his retirement in 2006, is the franchise leader in games played (655).  The team retired his jersey number 24 in November 2006.  Michel Picard is the franchise leader in goals (158), assists (222) and points (380); Darryl Bootland leads the Griffins in penalty minutes (1164).  For goaltenders, Joey MacDonald leads the franchise in games played (210), wins (109) and shutouts (20).  The current captain of the Grand Rapids Griffins is Brian Lashoff; he is the seventeenth player to serve in that capacity.

Key
 Made NHL debut after playing for Griffins.
 Appeared in a Griffins game during the 2021–22 season.
 Made NHL debut after playing for Griffins and appeared in a Griffins game during the 2021–22 season.

Goaltenders

Skaters

Notes
This total does not include Chris Chelios, Jody Hull, Curtis Joseph, Manny Legace, Andreas Lilja and Chris Osgood, who returned to the NHL following conditioning stints in Grand Rapids.
The seasons column lists the first year of the season of the player's first game and the last year of the season of the player's last game. For example, a player who played one game in the 1996–97 IHL season would be listed as playing with the team from 1996 to 1997, regardless of what calendar year the game occurred within.
During the Griffins' existence, ties were not an attainable outcome in the IHL and were only attainable in the AHL until the 2004–05 season.
"Overtime losses" encompasses all point-earning losses that occur after regulation play, including overtime losses proper and shootout losses.
During the 2007–08 season, the Griffins rotated the captaincy among Mark Cullen, Ryan Oulahen and Garrett Stafford on a five-game basis.

References
General

Specific

 
 
Grand Rapids Griffins
Grand Rapids Griffins players